Emiliano Grillo (born 14 September 1992) is an Argentine professional golfer who plays on the PGA Tour. He won the 2015 Frys.com Open on the PGA Tour.

Early years and amateur career
In his youth, Grillo was quarter-finalist at the 2008 U.S. Junior Amateur. He got the 2009 Byron Nelson International Junior Golf Award.

Professional career
Grillo turned professional in 2011 and earned playing status on the European Tour via Qualifying School. He finished 10th in his first event, the 2012 Africa Open. He finished 94th in the 2012 European Tour Order of Merit and 89th in 2013.

In February 2014, Grillo had his best finish to date on the European Tour, when he finished runner-up behind Stephen Gallacher at the Omega Dubai Desert Classic. Later in the season he finished 8th at the BMW International Open and the BMW Masters, and 11th at the Turkish Airlines Open. He ended 44th on the European Tour Race to Dubai. He also won the Visa Open de Argentina on PGA Tour Latinoamérica.

Grillo began the 2015 European Tour season with a third place at the Volvo China Open, a fifth place at the Qatar Masters, a sixth place at the Open de España and an 11th place at the Shenzhen International. He finished fourth at the DP World Tour Championship, Dubai and 40th on the Race to Dubai.

Also in 2015, Grillo lost in a five-man playoff at the Puerto Rico Open on the PGA Tour, playing on a sponsor's exemption, and finished tenth at the Barbasol Championship. In just seven starts, he earned enough to qualify for the 2015 Web.com Tour Finals. He claimed a ninth place at the Hotel Fitness Championship, a runner-up at the Small Business Connection Championship and a first place at the Web.com Tour Championship. Therefore, he finished second at the Finals money list and got a card for the 2016 PGA Tour. Since Grillo only played in seven events during the 2014–15 season, he was still considered a rookie for the 2015–16 season.

In his eighth career PGA Tour event and first as a member, Grillo won the season-opening Frys.com Open on the 2016 PGA Tour, after beating veteran Kevin Na in a sudden-death playoff. He made a 25-foot birdie putt on the 72nd hole for 3-under-par 69, which was later tied by Na. Grillo then missed a three-foot putt for victory on the first playoff hole, but sealed the win on the second hole with a birdie after Na ended up behind a tree and could only make bogey. The victory gained Grillo entry to the Masters and the 2016 PGA Championship. He also moved up to 36th in the Official World Golf Ranking.

At the 2016 major tournaments, Grillo finished 12th at the Open Championship, 13th at the PGA Championship, 17th at the Masters and 54th at the U.S. Open, with score cards of 283, 274, 292 and 293. He was runner-up at the Japan Golf Tour's ISPS Handa Global Cup. He was voted 2016 PGA Tour Rookie of the Year.

Amateur wins
2007 Pereira Iraola Cup (as low amateur at the Argentine Open)
2009 Pereira Iraola Cup (as low amateur at the Argentine Open)
2011 Terra Cotta Invitational

Professional wins (3)

PGA Tour wins (1)

PGA Tour playoff record (1–1)

Web.com Tour wins (1)

PGA Tour Latinoamérica wins (1)

Playoff record
Japan Golf Tour playoff record (0–1)

Results in major championships
Results not in chronological order in 2020.

CUT = missed the half-way cut
"T" = tied
NT = No tournament due to COVID-19 pandemic

Summary

Most consecutive cuts made – 6 (2015 PGA – 2017 Masters)
Longest streak of top-10s – n/a

Results in The Players Championship

CUT = missed the halfway cut
"T" indicates a tie for a place
C = Cancelled after the first round due to the COVID-19 pandemic

Results in World Golf Championships

QF, R16, R32, R64 = Round in which player lost in match play
"T" = tied

Team appearances
Amateur
Eisenhower Trophy (representing Argentina): 2008, 2010

Professional
World Cup (representing Argentina): 2013
Presidents Cup (representing the International team): 2017

See also
2011 European Tour Qualifying School graduates
2015 Web.com Tour Finals graduates

References

External links

Argentine male golfers
European Tour golfers
PGA Tour golfers
Olympic golfers of Argentina
Golfers at the 2016 Summer Olympics
Korn Ferry Tour graduates
Golfers from Florida
Sportspeople from Chaco Province
People from Resistencia, Chaco
Sportspeople from Bradenton, Florida
1992 births
Living people